Marasmarcha samarcandica is a moth of the family Pterophoridae. It is known from Russia and Kazakhstan. Its habitat is chalk and desert steppes and semideserts.

Appearance
Marasmarcha samarcandica has a lightened, whitish central area on the forewings.

Original description

References

Moths described in 1930
Exelastini